508 East Factors Walk is a historic building in Savannah, Georgia, United States. The building dates to 1889, when a three-year construction process began, but the earlier warehouse that stood at the location dated to 1812. The new construction added several pedestrian bridges that connect the building to the "Green" (Emmet Park) between the adjacent Rossiter Place and East Bay Street, passing over East Factors Walk. It is now Olde Harbour Inn. 
 
Tide Water Oil Company leased two floors of the new building, but in 1892 the building was destroyed by a fire. The premises were rebuilt, and Standard Oil occupied the space until 1907. The building remained empty for more than two decades. Tide Water Oil Company was later purchased by Standard Oil.

In 1930, Alexander Brothers Company, a blue jeans and overall factory, moved in. They remained there until 1980. 

In 1985, the building was completely renovated. It was reopened in 1987 as the Olde Harbour Inn, its current occupant. Four years later, Savannah's HLC Hotels, Inc. purchased the inn as the first property in its "collection of upscale historic Savannah inns." It now owns five other inns and hotels.

As of February 2022, the businesses occupying the ground floor of the River Street elevation are Travel House, Exotic Cigars and Something Different.

See also
Buildings in Savannah Historic District (Savannah, Georgia)

Gallery

References

External links
 Olde Harbour Inn official website

Office buildings in Savannah, Georgia
Savannah Historic District